Cecil E. Muellerleile (March 14, 1907 – March 1972) was an American football player, coach, and college athletics administrator.  He served as the head football coach at Saint Louis University from 1934 to 1939, compiling a record of 28–23–8.  Muellerleile played college football at Saint Louis from 1929 to 1931.  He was married to Margaret Keaney, with whom he had five children including actress Marianne Muellerleile.

Head coaching record

References

1907 births
1972 deaths
Saint Louis Billikens athletic directors
Saint Louis Billikens football players
Saint Louis Billikens football coaches